Lea Johanna Dastich (born 30 April 2000) is a retired German figure skater. She is a two-time Bavarian Open bronze medalist (2016, 2017) and a two-time German national medalist (silver in 2017, bronze in 2018). She has qualified to the final segment at four ISU Championships and finished in the top ten twice (2017 Junior Worlds, 2018 Junior Worlds).

Career

Early years 
Dastich began learning to skate in 2003. In the 2012–2013 season, she competed internationally in the advanced novice ranks, winning bronze at the 2012 NRW Trophy. In 2013–2014, she began appearing in junior internationals.

2014–2015 season 
Dastich received her first ISU Junior Grand Prix (JGP) assignments in the 2014–2015 season; she placed 8th in France and 7th in Germany. In January 2015, she won the German national junior title and the silver medal at the European Youth Olympic Festival in Dornbirn, Austria.

2015–2016 season 
Making her senior international debut, Dastich finished 14th at the Nebelhorn Trophy, an ISU Challenger Series event in September 2015. She finished fourth at the German Championships. In February 2016, she won her first senior international medal – bronze at the Bavarian Open. In March, she represented Germany at the 2016 World Junior Championships in Debrecen, Hungary. She placed 18th in the short program, 10th in the free skate, and 12th overall. During the season, she was coached by Anett Pötzsch in Dresden.

2016–2017 season 
In December 2016, Dastich received the senior silver medal at the German Championships, having finished second to Nathalie Weinzierl. In February 2017, she repeated as the bronze medalist at the Bavarian Open. The following month, Dastich placed 8th at the 2017 World Junior Championships, scoring personal bests in every segment of the competition.

2017–2018 season 
Competing in her fourth JGP season, Dastich placed 8th in Austria and 6th in Croatia in September. In January, she qualified to the final segment and finished 16th overall at the 2018 European Championships in Moscow, Russia. In March, she placed 10th at the 2018 World Junior Championships in Sofia, Bulgaria.

2018–2019 and 2019–2020 seasons 
Dastich did not compete due to an injury.

2020-2021 Season: Return 
Dastich was slated to make her return to competition at the 2020 CS Nebelhorn Trophy but withdrew prior to the event.

Programs

Competitive highlights 
CS: Challenger Series; JGP: Junior Grand Prix

References

External links 
 

2000 births
German female single skaters
Living people
Sportspeople from Dresden